Glenn Muir (born 17 November 1971) is a New Zealand cricketer. He played in six first-class and eleven List A matches for Canterbury from 1994 to 1998.

See also
 List of Canterbury representative cricketers

References

External links
 

1971 births
Living people
New Zealand cricketers
Canterbury cricketers
Cricketers from Dunedin